"Things We Lost in the Fire" is the eighth episode of the twelfth season of the American television medical drama Grey's Anatomy, and the 253rd episode overall. It aired November 19, 2015 on ABC in the United States. The episode was written by Tia Napolitano and directed by Rob Corn. On its initial airing the episode was watched by 8.50 million viewers and opened up to positive reviews from television critics.

Plot
While rumors spread like wildfire about Owen's connection to Nathan, real wildfires send a multitude of patients to the hospital, including Owen's mother's boyfriend. Meredith and Amelia continue to fight when Amelia finds out that Owen has been talking to Meredith and not her; the fight escalates until Meredith says she wants Amelia out of the house. Alex and Jo fall on hard times when she feels like Alex is choosing Meredith over her, but it turns out that Alex was planning a marriage proposal with Meredith's help. In the meantime, Jo patches things up with Stephanie, and they become friends again. Andrew tells Maggie that he likes her but he finds it difficult to deal with Maggie's over-professional behaviour with him at work. After having sex, Jackson and April drift further apart and eventually face the inevitable. Arizona continues to struggle with finding a date. Nathan, having once again fought with Owen, goes to Joe's bar where he encounters a distraught Amelia. Unaware of her history with addiction, he offers to buy her a drink and she accepts a vodka tonic. Meredith talks to Owen's mother about Nathan and learns something new about Owen: he once had a sister.

Reviews

References

External links
 

Grey's Anatomy (season 12) episodes
2015 American television episodes